Shipway is an English language surname. It may refer to:

Frank Shipway (1935–2014), British conductor
George Shipway (1908–1982), British writer
Mark Shipway (born 1976), Australian rugby league player
Matt Shipway (born 1985), Australian rugby league player and coach 
William Shipway (1862–1925), Australian politician

English-language surnames